OPS 5112, also known as Navstar 2, NDS-2, GPS I-2 and GPS SVN-2, was an American navigation satellite launched in 1978 as part of the Global Positioning System development programme. It was the second of eleven Block I GPS satellites to be launched.

Background 
Global Positioning System (GPS) was developed by the U.S. Department of Defense to provide all-weather round-the-clock navigation capabilities for military ground, sea, and air forces. Since its implementation, GPS has also become an integral asset in numerous civilian applications and industries around the globe, including recreational used (e.g., boating, aircraft, hiking), corporate vehicle fleet tracking, and surveying. GPS employs 24 spacecraft in 20,200 km circular orbits inclined at 55°. These vehicles are placed in 6 orbit planes with four operational satellites in each plane.

Spacecraft 
The first eleven spacecraft (GPS Block 1) were used to demonstrate the feasibility of the GPS system. They were 3-axis stabilized, nadir pointing using reaction wheels. Dual solar arrays supplied over 400 W. They had S-band (SGLS) communications for control and telemetry and UHF cross-link between spacecraft. They were manufactured by Rockwell Space Systems, were 5.3 m across with solar panels deployed, and had a design life expectancy of 5 years. Unlike the later operational satellites, GPS Block 1 spacecraft were inclined at 63°.

Launch 
OPS 5112 was launched at 10:34 UTC on 13 May 1978, atop an Atlas F launch vehicle with an SGS-1 upper stage. The Atlas used had the serial number 49F, and was originally built as an Atlas F. The launch took place from Vandenberg Space Launch Complex 3 (SLC-3E) at Vandenberg Air Force Base, and placed OPS 5112 into a transfer orbit. The satellite raised itself into medium Earth orbit using a Star-27 apogee motor.

Mission 
It broadcast the PRN 07 signal in the GPS demonstration constellation, and was retired from service on 16 July 1981.

References 

1978 in spaceflight
GPS satellites
Spacecraft launched in 1978